Sir Arthur Shaen, 2nd Baronet (c.1650 – 24 June 1725) was an Anglo-Irish politician. 

Shaen was the son of Sir James Shaen, 1st Baronet and Frances FitzGerald, a daughter of George FitzGerald, 16th Earl of Kildare. Between 1692 and his death in 1725, he was the Member of Parliament for Lismore in the Irish House of Commons. On 13 December 1695 he succeeded to his father's baronetcy. Shaen was High Sheriff of Mayo in 1708 and High Sheriff of Roscommon in 1709 and 1718. 

He was married twice; firstly to Jane Hele, daughter and heiress of Sir Samuel Hele, 2nd Baronet, and secondly to Susanna Magan, by whom he had two daughters. On his death without male heirs, his title became extinct.

References

Year of birth uncertain
1725 deaths
17th-century Anglo-Irish people
18th-century Anglo-Irish people
Baronets in the Baronetage of Ireland
High Sheriffs of Mayo
High Sheriffs of Roscommon
Irish MPs 1692–1693
Irish MPs 1695–1699
Irish MPs 1703–1713
Irish MPs 1713–1714
Irish MPs 1715–1727
Members of the Parliament of Ireland (pre-1801) for County Waterford constituencies